Dovetail is an album by saxophonist Lee Konitz's Terzet, recorded in 1983 and released on the Sunnyside label.

Critical reception

The AllMusic review stated: "The repertoire is certainly a bit offbeat for these modernists ... but the musicians come up with fresh statements on all of the tunes. A continually interesting set, like most of Lee Konitz's recordings".

Track listing 
All compositions by Lee Konitz, Harold Danko and Jay Leonhart except where noted.
 "I Want to Be Happy" (Vincent Youmans, Irving Caesar) – 9:42
 "The Night Has a Thousand Eyes" (Buddy Bernier, Jerry Brainin) – 4:54
 "Counter-Point" – 2:19
 "Dovetail" – 7:45
 "Sweet Georgia Brown" (Ben Bernie, Maceo Pinkard, Kenneth Casey) – 6:20
 "Alone Together"  (Arthur Schwartz, Howard Dietz) – 7:04
 "Cherokee" (Ray Noble) – 9:11
 "Penthouse Serenade (When We're Alone)" (Val Burton, Will Jason) – 3:27
 "Play Fiddle Play" (Jerry Bock, Sheldon Harnick) – 8:04

Personnel 
Lee Konitz – alto saxophone, soprano saxophone, tenor saxophone, vocals
Harold Danko – piano
Jay Leonhart – bass

References 

Lee Konitz albums
1983 albums
Sunnyside Records albums